was the third single by the Japanese band The Blue Hearts. It was released on November 21, 1987, the same time that the band's second album, Young and Pretty, was released. Lyrics and music were written by Hiroto Kōmoto, the band's lead vocalist, and was arranged by The Blue Hearts. The single is 9m17s in length.

Original recording
The falsetto at the beginning of the song was done by Junnosuke Kawaguchi, the band's bassist. Though he generally speaks with a low voice, he sings in falsetto for a number of songs.

"Chain Gang" was originally planned to be on their debut album, but was shelved due to concern with the lyrics, particularly the line about killing Christ.

Related media
The promotional video was an animated video. In the video, Kōmoto was a monkey, Mashima was a penguin, Kawaguchi was a pig and Tetsuya Kajiwara (the drummer) was a polar bear.

References

The Blue Hearts songs
1987 singles
Songs written by Hiroto Kōmoto